César Alejandro Reyes Muñoz (born June 22, 1988) is a Chilean footballer who plays for Naval.

Reyes began his playing career with Colo-Colo where he joined the youth ranks in 2000 and made his professional debut in 2006 versus Santiago Wanderers.

Honours

Club
Colo-Colo
 Primera División de Chile (3): 2006 Clausura, 2007 Apertura, 2007 Clausura

External links
 BDFA profile

1988 births
Living people
Association football forwards
Chilean footballers
Colo-Colo footballers
C.D. Antofagasta footballers
Deportes Concepción (Chile) footballers
A.C. Barnechea footballers
Chilean Primera División players
Primera B de Chile players
Footballers from Santiago